Ptychadenidae is a family of frogs commonly known as the grassland frogs. These frogs occur in Sub-Saharan Africa. 

Ptychadenidae was previously considered to be a tribe or subfamily in the family Ranidae, but its position as a separate family is now well established.

Subfamilies and genera
There are three genera with a total 60 species:
Hildebrandtia Nieden, 1907 — 3 species
Lanzarana Clarke, 1982 — 1 species
Ptychadena Boulenger, 1917 — 59 species

References

 
Amphibian families